William Henry Granville, 3rd Earl of Bath (30 January 1692 – 17 May 1711) was an English nobleman.

Origins
He was the only son of Charles Granville, 2nd Earl of Bath, by his second wife Isabella de Nassau d'Auverquerque, sister of Henry de Nassau d'Auverquerque, 1st Earl of Grantham.

Career
He was styled Viscount Lansdown from August to September 1701, when he succeeded in the earldom after his father committed suicide, allegedly because of the debts he had inherited.

Death
Lord Bath died of smallpox in May 1711, aged 19, when the earldom became extinct.

References

1692 births
1711 deaths
Deaths from smallpox
3
William
Infectious disease deaths in England